The Hôtel de Galliffet is a historic hôtel particulier in the 7th arrondissement of Paris, France.

History
The hotel was built from 1776 to 1792, for Alexandre de Galliffet, the President of the Parliament of Aix-en-Provence who also built the Château du Tholonet in Le Tholonet.  It was designed by Etienne François Legrand.

Subsequently, the hotel was the residence of Minister Charles-François Delacroix, and thus the childhood home of General Charles-Henri Delacroix and painter Eugène Delacroix. It was later the residence of Charles Maurice de Talleyrand-Périgord, who served as the Prime Minister of France in 1815.

In 1972 the building was used as the Italian embassy. The hotel is now home to the Italian Cultural Institute in Paris.

References

Galliffet
Houses completed in 1792
Buildings and structures in the 7th arrondissement of Paris